San Tiso is the only parish in San Tirso de Abres, a municipality within the province and autonomous community of Asturias, in northern Spain.

Demography 
Total population is 421 inhabitants (208 men and 213 women). They are distributed in the following list of towns.

 A Antigua (34)
 A Carretera (24)
 O Castro (9)
 Eilale (12)
 Espasande (13)
 Foxas (5)
 Goxe (6)
 A Grandela (14)
 O Chao (115)
 Lombal (3)
 O Louredal (1)
 Lourido (15)
 Matela (3)
 A Mourela (6)
 Naraído (5)
 Prado (0)
 Salcido (31)
 San Andrés (31)
 Sobredaveiga (6)
 Solmayor (11)
 Trasdacorda (4)
 Valiñaseca (0)
 As Veigas (35)
 Vilar (11)
 Vilelas (16)

Economy 
Most of the workers work in the primary sector and services.

Churches 
Its parish temple is dedicated to San Salvador, although it also has numerous chapels such as the Chapel of the Immaculate, of the Virgen del Carmen, of San Isidro, of San José, of San Juan, of San Juan Bautista, of San Miguel, of San Roque, Santa Apolonia and Santa Elena.

References 

Parishes in Asturias